Granite Hills High School is a public high school located in Apple Valley, California and is part of the  Apple Valley Unified School District. The school was established in 1999 to relieve pressure on the crowded Apple Valley High School.

Sports 
The school's sports teams are called Granite Hills Cougars and compete in the Desert Sky League of the CIF Southern Section.
The school has been competing in the Desert Sky League Since 2000.

Notable alumni
 Bryce Quigley (Class of 2010)  NFL offensive lineman

Notes

External links
School website

High schools in San Bernardino County, California
Educational institutions established in 1999
Public high schools in California
1999 establishments in California